Prince Maciej Radziwiłł (10 November 1749 – 2 September 1800) was a Polish-Lithuanian  noble (szlachcic), composer and librettist.

Biography 
Around 1780, Maciej (Matthias) lived at Nieśwież, the house of Karol Radziwiłł, governor of Vilnius Province, who maintained a company of actors, musicians and dancers there and at his estates in Alba (near Nieśwież), Ołyka, Słuck, Biała Podlaska and elsewhere. While at Nieśwież, Radziwiłł wrote the libretto for Jan Dawid Holland's opera Agatka, czyli Przyjazd pana (‘Agatha, or The Master's Arrival’) which was performed on 17 September 1784 during King Stanisław August's visit to Nieśwież. He also wrote the libretto and composed the music for the three-act opera Wójt osady albiańskiej (‘The Headman of the Settlers at Alba’) which premiered in Alba on 4 November 1786.

Radziwiłł was owner of Szydłowiec, Grand Podkomorzy of Lithuania since 1786, and castellan of Vilnius since 1788. He moved to the town of Vilnius where he composed some instrumental and orchestral music and was awarded with the Order of the White Eagle on February 18, 1788.

Sources
Alina Nowak-Romanowicz: "Prince Maciej Radziwiłł", Grove Music Online ed. L. Macy (Accessed September 20, 2008), (subscription access)

Secular senators of the Polish–Lithuanian Commonwealth
1749 births
1800 deaths
Polish composers
Librettists
Polish opera composers
Maciej
18th-century classical composers
18th-century male musicians
Polish male classical composers
Recipients of the Order of the White Eagle (Poland)